Slipstream is an album by Sutherland Brothers and Quiver, released in 1976 by CBS Records, shortly after their top ten single "Arms of Mary", and reached No. 49 on the UK Albums Chart. A single from the album, "Secrets" was released and reached No. 35 on the UK Singles Chart.

Track listing 
 "Slipstream" (Iain Sutherland) - 2:31
 "Wild Love" (Iain Sutherland) - 3:44
 "Saturday Night" (Gavin Sutherland) - 2:28
 "If I Could Have Your Loving" (Iain Sutherland) - 3:28
 "Love on the Side" (Iain Sutherland) - 4:15
 "Secrets" (Iain Sutherland) - 3:08
 "Dark Powers" (Iain Sutherland) - 4:50
 "Something's Burning" (Gavin Sutherland) - 3:56
 "Sweet Cousin" (Iain Sutherland) - 3:00
 "Midnight Rendezvous" (Gavin Sutherland) - 2:45
 "The Prisoner" (Iain Sutherland) - 4:08
 "High Nights" (Tim Renwick - Instrumental) - 2:32

Production
Produced by Ron Albert and Howard Albert (A Fat Albert Production)
Engineered by Mike Ross
Mixed at Criteria Studios, London.

Personnel
Gavin Sutherland
Iain Sutherland
Tim Renwick - guitar
John "Willie" Nelson - drums
String and horn parts arranged and conducted by Mike Lewis
Albhy Galuten - keyboards
"Flaco" Pedron - percussion

References

1976 albums
The Sutherland Brothers albums
Quiver (band) albums
CBS Records albums
Columbia Records albums
Albums produced by the Albert Brothers